Antonio Longás Ferrer (born 24 August 1984) is a Spanish former professional footballer who played as a central midfielder.

He appeared in a total of 201 Segunda División matches over seven seasons (five goals), representing mainly Sabadell. In La Liga, he played with Zaragoza.

Club career
Born in Zaragoza, Aragon, Longás was a youth product of Real Zaragoza's youth system, and he made his first-team debut on 17 September 2006 in a 2–0 home win against RCD Mallorca. He finished the season with ten La Liga appearances for his hometown club, mostly as a late substitute.

To gain more experience, Longás was loaned the following campaign to CD Tenerife in the second division, and was regularly used at the Canary Islands side, scoring in a 2–2 home draw with Albacete Balompié. In August 2008 he was loaned once again, now to FC Barcelona B, coached by former Spanish international Luis Enrique and just promoted to the third level.

In late July 2009, Longás was released by Zaragoza and joined FC Cartagena, recently returned to division two. He continued playing in that tier in the following seasons, with Gimnàstic de Tarragona, Racing de Santander and CE Sabadell FC.

References

External links

1984 births
Living people
Footballers from Zaragoza
Spanish footballers
Association football midfielders
La Liga players
Segunda División players
Segunda División B players
Real Zaragoza B players
Real Zaragoza players
CD Tenerife players
FC Barcelona Atlètic players
FC Cartagena footballers
Gimnàstic de Tarragona footballers
Racing de Santander players
CE Sabadell FC footballers